Henry Baker was an Anglo-Irish soldier, noted for his time as Governor of Londonderry. He oversaw the successful defence of the city during the Siege of Derry in 1689, but died of illness before Derry was relieved.

Baker was a professional, career soldier. He served as part of the Tangier Garrison, something he had in common with other leading figures of the Siege of Derry such as Robert Lundy, Percy Kirke and John Mitchelburne. Following the Irish Protestant rebellion against James II in 1688–89, Baker joined a newly raised regiment in Eastern Ulster. He was present during a failed attack on Carrickfergus and then at the Break of Dromore when an Irish Army force under Richard Hamilton routed Arthur Rawdon's Protestant troops.

With many other survivors of Dromore, Baker headed west towards Derry, one of the few remaining centres to hold out against James II. The Protestants suffered another defeat at the Battle of Cladyford, and the Jacobite forces approached Derry to besiege it. After the previous Governor Robert Lundy had resigned his post and left the city, Baker was offered the governorship. He agreed to take command, provided that the Reverend George Walker was appointed his deputy to oversee the city's stores.

Under Baker's leadership the city's defenders remained active, sallying out a number of times against the besiegers. After he fell ill command was handed over to John Mitchelburne, who was formally elected governor after Baker's death. Baker was buried in St Columb's Cathedral in Derry.

References

Bibliography
 Childs, John. The Williamite War in Ireland, 1688-1691. Continuum, 2007.
 Doherty, Richard. The Siege of Derry: The Military History. Spellmount, 2010.

17th-century Irish military personnel
Irish soldiers
Year of birth unknown
1689 deaths
Soldiers of the Tangier Garrison
Williamite military personnel of the Williamite War in Ireland